Zittelina may refer to:
 Zittelina (brachiopod), a fossil genus of brachiopods in the family Kingenidae
 Zittelina (alga), a fossil genus of alga in the family Dasycladaceae